Spraggett is a surname. Notable people with the surname include:

 Allen Spraggett (1932–2022), Canadian writer and broadcaster
 Kevin Spraggett (born 1954), Canadian chess grandmaster

See also